The Orléans tramway consists of two tram lines in the city of Orléans, Centre-Val de Loire, France. Line A runs roughly north–south, and Line B roughly east–west. The lines cross at Place De Gaulle in the city centre.

Line A
The line is served by 22 trams.

Line B
The line connects the communes of La Chapelle-Saint-Mesmin, Saint-Jean-de-la-Ruelle, Orléans, and Saint-Jean-de-Braye, serving 25 stations, and opened in June 2012. 21 Alstom Citadis 302 trams were ordered to provide the service.

Ticketing
Several tram stops have ticket machines offering a variety of ticket types. , a standard single ticket cost €1.50. The same tickets can also be used on the local bus network.

Network Map

See also 
 Trams in France
 List of town tramway systems in France

References

External links 

 TAO le Réseau de l'Agglo – official website

Transport in Orléans
Tram transport in France
Transport in Centre-Val de Loire
Orléans